Sport climbing has been included in the Asian Games since the 2018 Asian Games in Palembang, Indonesia.

Editions

Events

Medal table

Participating nations

List of medalists

References

External links 
 International Federation of Sport Climbing

 
Sports at the Asian Games